Gérard Joseph (born 22 October 1949) is a Haitian football goalkeeper who was a member of the Haitian squad in the 1974 FIFA World Cup. He also played for Haiti at the 1981 CONCACAF Championship versus Cuba and El Salvador. He played for Racing CH, the Washington Diplomats of the NASL and the New York Apollo and New York United of the ASL.

References

External links
FIFA profile
 Gérard Joseph NASL stats

1949 births
Haitian footballers
Haitian expatriate footballers
Haiti international footballers
Association football goalkeepers
Expatriate soccer players in the United States
Haitian expatriate sportspeople in the United States
Racing CH players
1974 FIFA World Cup players
Washington Diplomats (NASL) players
North American Soccer League (1968–1984) players
New York Apollo players
New York United players
American Soccer League (1933–1983) players
Living people